Nizhny Novgorod Fair (old name — Makaryev Fair) was a fair in Nizhny Novgorod held annually every July near Makaryev Monastery on the left bank of the Volga River from the mid-16th century to 1816. Following a massive fire in 1816, it was moved to Nizhny Novgorod, but for some decades thereafter it still was commonly referred to 
as Makaryev Fair. It attracted many foreign merchants from India, Iran, and Central Asia.

According to Durland, a journalist who visited the fair in 1905, the fair dates from "before the discovery of America." The fair was established by Muscovite princes to compete with, and draw commerce away from, a fair held since 1257, at Kazan, the Tartar capital. At the time Durland visited the fair, it consisted of 60 buildings, 2,500 bazaars and 8,000 exhibits, with goods for sale, along with a broad range of performances for the public.

This fair was a commerce centre to sell up to half the total production of export goods in Russia. The fair ceased in 1929. A society named Nizhegorodskaya yarmarka (Nizhny Novgorod fair) was created in 1991 with its headquarters in the former main fair building. However, today it is not actually a fair, but an exhibition center. Located in the historical centre of Old Kanavino.

Buildings

The Main Fair building 
The center of the fair was the main building in the spirit of classicism and the side administrative buildings that formed the central square. To protect from floods, a 3.5 m high dam was built.

By the end of the 1880s, the Main Fair Building was very outdated and it was decided to completely rebuild it. The following year the construction of a new building was completed according to the project of the architects K. Treiman, A. von Gauguin and A. Trumbitsky. The building was built in the style of ancient Russian architecture of the 17th century. The building served as an administrative center. During the fair, it housed the governor's apartment, fair office, committee, branch of the state bank and others. On the first floor there was a beautiful passage in which there was a retail trade.

On November 4, 2017, a new multimedia exhibition "Russia is My History" was opened in the Main Fair Building. The main focus of the exhibition is the history of Nizhny Novgorod, starting from Finnic peoples. On the territory of the complex there are departments in which they tell about the foundation of the city, the struggle for independence in the Time of Troubles and the bombing of the city during the World War II. On the first day of work, the entrance to the exhibition was free, because of which a long line lined up in front of the Main Fair Building.

Transfiguration Cathedral 

Also called Old-fair Cathedral. Temple in the style of late classicism. Until September 12, 2009, was the cathedral of the Nizhny Novgorod diocese. The height of the temple is 40 meters.

The project of the cathedral was designed by Agustín de Betancourt. To the construction of the building he attracted the architect Auguste de Montferrand - the creator of St. Isaac's Cathedral in St. Petersburg. The construction of the cathedral was begun in 1816. The iconostasis of the cathedral was painted by the Italian Torricelli according to the European canons, so many merchants refused to pray before the icons with naked bodies. Some people brought icons with them. The new iconostasis was created by the architect Vasily Stasov.

It became known as an Old-fair cathedral after the construction of a new Alexander Nevsky Cathedral.

The building of the cathedral was built behind the main fairground on the main axis of the fair plan. It stood on the mound and, over time, groundwaters and floods blurred the soil. The building began to draft and cracks appeared in the walls. At the end of the 19th century the cathedral was completely restored by the architect Robert Kilevain.

After the October Revolution, the cathedral was closed. The warehouse was located in the temple, and in the administrative building - apartments. In April 1989, by the decision of the Council for Religious Affairs, the cathedral was transferred to the Gorky Diocese for restoration and use as a cathedral. Restoration work was started in the cathedral. At the same time, the church began to hold divine services on Saturdays and Sundays.

September 11, 2009 Patriarch of Moscow and all Rus' Cyril took part in the opening of the monument to Nizhegorodians - participants in the liquidation of the consequences of the Chernobyl disaster. The monument consists of a two-meter figure of an angel mounted on a three-meter pedestal. Around it are granite slabs with quotations from the Holy Scripture and the names of the dead.

Alexander Nevsky Cathedral 

Also called New-fair Cathedral. Orthodox cathedral. Built in the years 1868–1881 on the project of the architect Lev Dahl. The abbot is Archpriest Sergey Matveyev since January 12, 2005. The height of the temple is 87 meters.

In 1856 the merchants decided to build a new Orthodox cathedral in memory of the visit of the fair by Emperor Alexander II. They turned to the request for the construction of a new cathedral to Bishop Anthony and Governor A. Muraviov. A collection of donations was made. The required funds (454,667 rubles 28 kopecks) were recruited over 10 years (by 1866).

September 15, 1867 was established by the construction committee for the construction of the temple, and August 11, 1868, was laying the cathedral on the Strelka (Spit). The main construction of the cathedral was begun on August 18, 1868, and lasted for 13 years. In the cathedral were transported icons from the liquidated Makaryev monastery, which suffered from a fire.

In 1929, the temple was closed, valuables were seized. In the winter of 1930, according to the decision of the leadership of the Volga Flotilla, the iconostases and all the wooden ornaments of the cathedral were broken up for firewood to heat the city's houses.

In the late 1920s, a project for the reconstruction of the fairground was developed. It was planned to dismantle the cathedral and build a lighthouse with a monument to Lenin in this place. This project was not carried out, but in the late 1930s, the tents on the roof of the cathedral were dismantled.

During World War II, an anti-aircraft battery was installed on the site of the central tent of the cathedral, which defended the Gorky city (the name of Nizhny Novgorod in the Soviet era) from the Luftwaffe air raids.

In 1983, the restoration of the cathedral began, during this period, voluntary restorers took an active part. In 1989, the restoration of the broken tents of the temple began. In February 1991, the Brotherhood of St. Alexander Nevsky was established. And in June 1992 the cathedral was returned to the Russian Orthodox Church. On September 12, 2009, the cathedral was given the status of a cathedral (main).

References

Further reading 
 Alexandre Dumas, De Paris à Astrakan ou Voyage en Russie, 1858,
 Munro-Butler-Johnstone, Henry Alexander, A trip up the Volga to the fair of Nijni-Novgorod, Oxford: J. Parker and co., 1876.
 Fitzpatrick, Anne Lincoln, The Great Russian Fair: Nizhnii Novgorod, 1840-90, Houndmills, Basingstoke, Hampshire: Macmillan, in association with St. Antony's College, Oxford, 1990. 
Jules Verne, "Michael Strogoff: The Courier of the Czar" — This historical novel contains an interesting description of the fair at Nizhny Novgorod.
Durland, Kellogg. "The Red Reign, The True Story of an Adventurous Year in Russia." New York: The Century Company, 1908, 320–329. Another interesting description of the fair, which the author, a journalist, visited in 1905 just after the dissolution of the first Duma.

External links

Official site of Nizhny Novgorod Fair (in Russian)
History of Makaryev Fair (in Russian)

Tourist attractions in Nizhny Novgorod
Museums in Nizhny Novgorod
History of Nizhny Novgorod
Companies based in Nizhny Novgorod
Economic history of Russia
Russian Empire
Annual fairs
Fairs in Russia
Auguste de Montferrand buildings and structures
Convention centers in Russia
Economy of Nizhny Novgorod